Alexander Scott Malcolm (1 July 1864 – 19 July 1956) was an independent conservative and then Reform Party Member of Parliament and advocate of prohibition in New Zealand. 
 
He was born in Mansfield, England and educated at Horton College, Tasmania and the University of Otago where he was Macandrew Scholar in Political Science. He was a teacher at Kelso School, and was secretary of the Clutha No-Licence League when after passing of the 1893 Act allowing local "no-licence" polls Clutha became the first "dry" district. He supported prohibition in Parliament, and the South Otago Hospital Board of which he was a foundation member and chairman from 1923 to 1926. The South Otago Hospital in Balclutha was opened in 1926, as was the South Otago High School.

He was elected to the Clutha electorate in the 1905 general election, after being unsuccessful in 1899.

He was defeated in 1922. He was Chairman of Committees for three terms: 4 July 1913 to 20 November 1914, 7 July 1915 to 27 November 1919 and 15 July 1920 to 30 November 1922.

He was appointed to the Legislative Council on 16 June 1924 and served for one term until 15 June 1931, when his term ended.

He married Flora Jack of Hokitika in 1893. He was an elder of the Balclutha Presbyterian Church. He died in Dunedin in 1956, aged 92.

Notes

References

|-

1864 births
1956 deaths
Reform Party (New Zealand) MPs
Members of the New Zealand Legislative Council
Members of the New Zealand House of Representatives
Reform Party (New Zealand) MLCs
Unsuccessful candidates in the 1922 New Zealand general election
New Zealand MPs for South Island electorates
Unsuccessful candidates in the 1899 New Zealand general election
19th-century New Zealand educators
20th-century New Zealand politicians
English emigrants to New Zealand
New Zealand temperance activists
University of Otago alumni
Members of district health boards in New Zealand